Marcella is a British Nordic noir detective series, written, directed and produced by Swedish screenwriter Hans Rosenfeldt, creator of The Bridge. The series is produced by Buccaneer Media for ITV and distributed worldwide by Buccaneer's parent company Cineflix. It was first shown on ITV on 4 April 2016, with seven further episodes released weekly.

The series stars Anna Friel as Marcella Backland, a former London detective who returns to work to investigate an open case from 11 years earlier involving an unidentified serial killer who appears to have become active again. She has a hectic home life. Her husband, Jason (Nicholas Pinnock), has decided to leave her and to send their two children to a boarding school. Later on (in the second season) he uses Marcella's mental disorder as a means to take full custody of the children. Nina Sosanya (series one), Ray Panthaki and Jamie Bamber are also credited as principal members of the cast.

The series was commissioned in June 2015, with location filming taking place in London and the Port of Dover. After their first release on ITV, the episodes were made available to stream on Netflix outside the United Kingdom. The first series was released on DVD via Universal Pictures UK on 20 June 2016. In 2017, Friel was awarded the International Emmy Award for Best Actress for her performance in Marcella.

On 26 August 2016, ITV announced that a second series had been commissioned. The second series premiered on 19 February 2018 and was released on DVD on 16 April 2018. On 3 October 2018 it was announced that Marcella would be returning to ITV for a third series. It premiered internationally on Netflix on 14 June 2020, and began airing on ITV in the UK on 26 January 2021; it was also expected to be released on DVD in March 2021.

Synopsis

Series 1
Marcella Backland (Anna Friel), a former London Metropolitan Police Service detective, decides to return to work after her husband of 15 years, Jason (Nicholas Pinnock), abruptly announces he is leaving her. Marcella resumes her investigation into the three unsolved Grove Park murders from 2005, when it appears the serial killer responsible has returned.

Series 2
Marcella investigates a serial killer of children, encountering a paedophile, an arrogant millionaire, a 1970s rock star, and strange symbols relating to witchcraft. Her estranged husband Jason has become engaged to his rehab nurse even though their divorce is not yet finalised, putting their children in the middle of a custody battle that quickly becomes ugly. Marcella's blackouts continue, and she seeks counselling to help her remember what happened during them.

Series 3 
Marcella has assumed a new identity as Keira Devlin and is working undercover in Northern Ireland where she becomes involved with a wealthy crime family. More is learned of Marcella's mental health issues.

Cast

Main

Recurring

Series 1

Series 2

Series 3

Supporting

Series 1

Series 2

Series 3

 Paul Kennedy as Lawrence Corrigan
 Jorin Cooke as Conor Scott
 James Martin as Danny Armstrong

Episodes

Overview
<onlyinclude>

Series 1 (2016)

Series 2 (2018)

Series 3 (2021)
This series was released originally on Netflix in June 2021, however the televised dates were scheduled for Spring 2021.

Reception

Critical response

For series one, the review aggregator website Rotten Tomatoes reported a 73% approval rating with an average rating of 6.7/10, based on 15 critic reviews. The website's critics consensus reads, "Buoyed by Anna Friel, Marcella will satisfy any fan of dark crime drama." Metacritic, which uses a weighted average, assigned a score of 65 out of 100 based on 4 critics, indicating "generally favorable reviews ".

For series two, Rotten Tomatoes reported a 57% approval rating with an average rating of 5.3/10, based on 7 critic reviews. The third series has an 80% approval rating based on 5 critic reviews.

See also 
 Nordic noir

References

External links

2016 British television series debuts
2010s British crime drama television series
2010s British mystery television series
2010s British police procedural television series
2010s British workplace drama television series
2020s British crime drama television series
2020s British mystery television series
2020s British police procedural television series
2020s British workplace drama television series
Adultery in television
British detective television series
English-language television shows
ITV crime dramas
ITV mystery shows
Serial drama television series
Serial killers in television
Television shows set in London